On the Road (Chinese: 向世界出發) is a Chinese Cantonese-language travel television program produced by Television Broadcasts Limited in Hong Kong. The show aired for three seasons between 2006 and 2008. The meaning of the Chinese title is "Set off to the World", which gives a sense of the start of a journey to different parts of the global, experiencing different cultures and customs of different nations.

Premise
The show differs from the typical travel series produced by TVB, as it deals mainly with philosophical and life issues, rather than sightseeing and entertainment. The show would use a particular location's social life or struggles to bring out the intended topic for a particular arc.

Although rival television station ATV has made travel series based on relatively the same premises, this is the first time a series based on this genre received high ratings, mainly due to the dominant ratings advantage TVB has enjoyed since the advent of television broadcasting in Hong Kong.

Episodes

Season 1 (2006)

Season 2 (2007)

Season 3 (2008)

2006 Hong Kong television series debuts
2008 Hong Kong television series endings
TVB original programming